Diners, Drive-Ins and Dives (often nicknamed Triple D and stylized as Diners, Drive-Ins, Dives) is an American food reality television series that premiered on April 23, 2007, on the Food Network. It is hosted by Guy Fieri. The show originally began as a one-off special that aired on November 6, 2006. The show features a "road trip" concept, similar to Road Tasted, Giada's Weekend Getaways, and $40 a Day. Fieri travels around the United States, Canada, and Mexico looking at various diners, drive-in restaurants, and dive bars. He has also featured restaurants in European cities, including London and Florence, as well as in Cuba (see the episodes page).

Premise

Each episode generally has a unifying theme (such as burgers, ribs, or seafood) with the host visiting multiple restaurants within a single city to sample the food that corresponds to this theme. The program focuses on small, independent eateries featuring traditional comfort foods (such as barbecue, smoked meat, hamburgers, deep-fried food, pizza, steak, and bacon-and-egg breakfast), regional styles, or ethnic specialties. Often, the chosen restaurants will use fresh ingredients, home-style recipes, and gourmet culinary approaches to what is usually not considered gourmet food. The host interacts with both the customers, to get their opinion on the food, and with the kitchen staff, who demonstrate how to prepare one or more of the dishes.

Takeout
As a result of the ongoing COVID-19 pandemic, the show's format shifted to feature chefs sending Fieri boxes of ingredients and guiding him through the process via video link. Takeout episodes of the show were filmed at Fieri's home in California with the help of his children, Hunter and Ryder.

Guest appearances 
The show has had various stars appear in the kitchen alongside Guy Fieri, including fellow chefs Robert Irvine, Andrew Zimmern, Michael Symon, Emeril Lagasse, and Geoffrey Zakarian, as well as celebrities such as Matthew McConaughey, Gene Hackman, Rosie O'Donnell, Joe Theismann, Chris Rock, Kid Rock, Adam Sandler, Kevin James, Clint Bowyer, Martin Sheen, Gene Simmons, Steve Harwell, E-40 and Mick Fleetwood.

Lawsuit
In May 2011, Page Productions, the original producers of the show, filed a lawsuit against Food Network. The lawsuit alleges that the network failed to pay required production costs, and failed to make the show's host, Guy Fieri, available for taping.

A week after Food Network counter-sued the producer, a settlement was reached in August 2011, allowing the 12th season of the show to resume, with a new production company, Citizen Pictures.

Impact 
Throughout the years, more than 800 restaurants have been mentioned on the show, resulting in a dramatic increase in customers. Due to the show's popularity, long-term effects have included increases in both customers and sales.

In 2015, the owner of Duluth specialty market Northern Waters Smokehaus said that being featured in a 2010 episode had "jump started" its mail-order business, and that the long-term growth in business hadn't slowed.

Donatelli's, a restaurant in White Bear Lake, Minnesota, said that their appearance on the show "saved us from going out of business." They experienced an average, sustained 20% increase in sales since the airing of the episode in 2008. Over ten years later, the restaurant was still reaping the benefits of their appearance.

See also

Roadfood
Guy's Grocery Games
Guy's Big Bite

References

External links

Food Network original programming
2000s American cooking television series
2010s American cooking television series
2006 American television series debuts
English-language television shows
Food travelogue television series
2020s American cooking television series